The 35th Norwegian Biathlon Championships were held in Hattfjelldal, Nordland, Norway from 25 February to 28 February 1993 at the stadium Hattfjelldal skistadion, arranged by Hattfjelldal IL. There were 6 scheduled competitions: individual, team, and relay races for men and women. The sprint races for men and women were held on 9 January in Brumunddal.

In the women's relay, the Buskerud team crossed the finish line first, but received a one-minute penalty, and thus won bronze.

Schedule
All times are local (UTC+1).

Medal winners

Men

Women

References

Norwegian Biathlon Championships
1993 in biathlon
1993 in Norwegian sport